Lady (Hangul: 레이디) was a Korean pop group, noted as the first transgender group from that country. The band consisted of Sinae, Sahara, Binu and Yuna. According to the official story, they were the best out of hundreds who tried out to be part of this band. Although only three were supposed to be in the group, a fourth was added at the last minute.

Their formation was inspired by the emergence of Harisu, a Korean singer and actress, who is also transgender. Sinae has previously appeared in commercials with a female dance group as well as a music video by Cho PD, and Sahara is a 2003 beauty pageant winner in Thailand and a former jeans model.

Lady released their first, self-titled album in 2005, consisting of eight tracks, many of them being remixes of their first two singles, "Attention" and "Ladies Night". There was much attention given to them by the press, given their unique status as a transgender band in a conservative country. However, they were able to perform on Korean music shows only a handful of times, while their music and videos were not well received. In order to drum up more publicity, they released a photobook featuring nude shots of all the Lady members; this also failed to catapult them into stardom, however.

Lady officially disbanded in early 2007.

Discography

See also 
 Venus Flytrap (group)

References

External links 
  Arirang TV interview, found at Chosun Ilbo's English website.
 A news article from the China Daily, dated March 24, 2005.
 A news article from the Independent, dated October 22, 2005.

K-pop music groups
LGBT-themed musical groups
Musical groups disestablished in 2007
Musical groups established in 2005
South Korean dance music groups